The 2000 season of 1. deild karla was the 46th season of second-tier football in Iceland.

Standings

Top scorers

References
RSSSF Page

1. deild karla (football) seasons
Iceland
Iceland
2